South Karelian dialects, Karelian dialects or Southeast Finnish dialects are Eastern Finnish dialects spoken in South Karelia, along with eastern parts of Kymenlaakso (Virolahti and Miehikkälä). Prior to the Winter War, the dialects were spoken along the Karelian Isthmus and Ingria. However, the South Karelian dialect speakers from the parts of Karelia taken by the Soviet Union were evacuated into the rest of Finland where their speech was assimilated into the new environment. Use of the Ingrian dialects is declining.

South Karelian dialects have been influenced by Russian.

Features 
Standard Finnish /d/: → -

 lehen
 Standard Finnish: lehden 'leave's' (genitive singular of lehti)

Standard Finnish /ts/: → /ss/, /ht/ or /st/

 mehtä, messä, metsä
 Standard Finnish: metsä 'forest'

Inessive ending: -ssA → -s

 maas
 Standard Finnish: maassa 'on the ground; in a/the country'

Vowels -eä and -ea

 korkia
 Standard Finnish: korkea 'high, tall'

Palatalization

 ves Standard Finnish: vesi 'water'Third-person plural imperfect ending tulliid
 Standard Finnish: tulivat 'they came'Lack of syntactic gemination and glottal stop'''

syntactic gemination
 tule tänne /ˈtule ˈtænːe/ 
 Standard Finnish: tule tänne /ˈtuleˣ ˈtænːeˣ/ 'come here' (2nd-person singular imperative of tulla 'come')

glottal stop
 sadealue /ˈsɑdeˌɑlue/ 
 Standard Finnish: sadealue'' /ˈsɑdeʔˌɑlueˣ/ 'area of precipitation' (term used in weather forecasts)

Vocabulary 

 a = well 
 vot = good, well
 kehtoittaa = to be tired or bored
 sankia = thick
 tällviisii = in this manner
 lusti = joy
 potuska = pillow
 most = maybe

See also 
 Ingrian dialects
 Savonian dialects
 Tavastian dialects

References 

Finnish dialects